Myers v. United States, 272 U.S. 52 (1926), was a United States Supreme Court decision ruling that the President has the exclusive power to remove executive branch officials, and does not need the approval of the Senate or any other legislative body. It was distinguished in 1935 by Humphrey's Executor v. United States. However, in Seila Law LLC v. Consumer Financial Protection Bureau (2020), the Supreme Court interpreted Myers as establishing that the President generally has unencumbered removal power. Myers was the first Supreme Court case to address the president's removal powers.

Claim
In 1920, Frank S. Myers, a First-Class Postmaster in Portland, Oregon, was removed from office by President Woodrow Wilson. An 1876 federal law provided that "Postmasters of the first, second, and third classes shall be appointed and may be removed by the President with the advice and consent of the Senate." Myers argued that his dismissal violated this law, and he was entitled to back pay for the unfilled portion of his four-year term.

Opinion
Chief Justice (and former President) William Howard Taft, writing for the Court, noted that the Constitution does mention the appointment of officials, but is silent on their dismissal. He proceeded to conduct a voluminous examination on the history of the President's removal power. First, Taft examined the notes of the Constitutional Convention, and found their silence on the subject to be intentional: the Convention did discuss the dismissal of executive-branch staff, and believed it was implicit in the Constitution that the President did hold the exclusive power to remove his staff, whose existence was an extension of the President's own authority. 

Second, Taft discussed the Decision of 1789 and said that the decision indicated that a "considerable majority" of Congress were in "favor of declaring the power of removal to be in the President." He then analyzed subsequent congressional debates over the issue. 

The Court therefore found that the statute was unconstitutional, for it violated the separation of powers between the executive and legislative branches. In reaching this decision, it also expressly found the Tenure of Office Act, which had imposed a similar requirement on other Presidential appointees and was known for playing a key role in the impeachment of Andrew Johnson during the Reconstruction era, to have been invalid; it had been repealed by Congress some years before this decision.

Important to subsequent cases, dicta in Taft's opinion suggested Congress could never qualify the President's removal power.

Dissents
In a lengthy dissent, Justice McReynolds used an equally exhaustive analysis of quotes from members of the Constitutional Convention, writing that he found no language in the Constitution or in the notes from the Convention intended to grant the President the "illimitable power" to fire every appointed official, "as caprice may suggest", in the entire government with the exception of judges.

In a separate dissent, Justice Brandeis wrote that the fundamental case deciding the power of the Supreme Court, Marbury v. Madison, "assumed, as the basis of decision, that the President, acting alone, is powerless to remove an inferior civil officer appointed for a fixed term with the consent of the Senate; and that case was long regarded as so deciding."

In a third dissent, Justice Holmes noted that it was within the power of Congress to abolish the position of Postmaster entirely, not to mention to set the position's pay and duties, and he had no problem believing Congress also ought to be able to set terms of the position's occupiers.

Precedential value
Myers was the first case to concern congressional limitations on the President's removal power. In 1935, in Humphrey's Executor v. United States, the Supreme Court distinguished Myers and disavowed its dicta. Humphrey's distinguished executive officers from officers occupying "quasi-legislative" or "quasi-judicial" positions. The majority opinion stated that:

In Seila Law LLC v. Consumer Financial Protection Bureau (2020), the Court "interpreted Myers as establishing a general rule of unencumbered presidential removal authority for all executive officers."

See also

 Free Enterprise Fund v. Public Company Accounting Oversight Board
 List of United States Supreme Court cases, volume 272

References

External links

 

1926 in United States case law
Appointments Clause case law
United States separation of powers case law
United States Supreme Court cases of the Taft Court
United States Postal Service litigation
History of Portland, Oregon
Presidency of Woodrow Wilson
United States Supreme Court cases